The bidding process for UEFA Euro 2008 ended on 12 December 2002 when a joint bid from Austria and Switzerland was selected as the host.

History
When the deadline for bids to be entered closed in June 2002, seven bids representing twelve countries had been submitted: 
  Austria–Switzerland (joint bid)
  Bosnia and Herzegovina–Croatia (joint bid)
  Greece–Turkey (joint bid)
    Denmark–Finland–Norway–Sweden (joint bid titled Nordic 2008)
 Hungary
 Russia
  Scotland–Republic of Ireland (joint bid)

UEFA's National Teams Committee made a recommendation based on technical evaluation of the candidates on 12 December 2002, and concluded that only four bids had the capability of organising the tournament. These were ranked as follows:
1. Austria–Switzerland
2. Hungary 
3. Greece–Turkey
4. Denmark–Finland–Norway–Sweden

Later that day, members of the UEFA Executive Committee voted on the bids and Austria–Switzerland was selected as the winner.

Bids

Austria–Switzerland
Austria and Switzerland were selected to be the joint hosts of Euro 2008. The stadiums named in the bid process were:
 Tivoli-Neu, Innsbruck
 Wörthersee Stadion, Klagenfurt
 Stadion Wals-Siezenheim, Salzburg
 Ernst-Happel-Stadion, Vienna
 St. Jakob-Park, Basel
 Stadion Wankdorf, Bern
 Stade de Genève, Geneva
 Letzigrund, Zurich

Bosnia–Herzegovina–Croatia

Eight venues in eight cities across Croatia and Bosnia and Herzegovina were proposed to host matches at Euro 2008. According to Croatian football executive Ivan Brleković, the stadiums could have been renovated, with a promised €50 million investment earmarked by both countries' governments, while more funding had been secured for upgrading road infrastructure linking host cities.

Croatia
 Zagreb – Maksimir Stadium (capacity 45,000; planned to be expanded to 60,000)
 Split – Poljud Stadium (capacity 34,374; planned to be expanded to 40,000)
 Osijek – Gradski Vrt Stadium (capacity 19,220; planned to be expanded to 30,000) 
 Rijeka – Kantrida Stadium (capacity 12,000; planned to be expanded to 30,000)
Bosnia and Herzegovina
 Sarajevo – Koševo Stadium (capacity 37,500; planned to be expanded to 50,000) 
 Mostar – Bijeli Brijeg Stadium (capacity 15,000; planned to be expanded to 30,000)
 Banja Luka – Banja Luka Municipal Stadium (capacity 15,000; planned to be expanded to 30,000)
 Zenica – Bilino Polje Stadium (capacity 20,000; planned to be expanded to 30,000)

Greece–Turkey
Seven stadia in seven cities across Greece and Turkey were proposed to host matches at Euro 2008. Turkey set a budget of €50 million for the competition to construct a new stadium in Antalya, and €25 million to improve the Atatürk Stadium in İzmir. Greece had a budget of €50 million for stadium construction.
 Olympic Stadium, Athens
 Kaftanzoglio Stadium, Thessaloniki
 Pankritio Stadium, Heraklion
 Pampeloponnisiako Stadium, Patras
 Atatürk Olympic Stadium, Istanbul
 New Antalya Stadium, Antalya
 İzmir Atatürk Stadium, İzmir

Nordic 2008

Four Nordic countries (Denmark, Finland, Norway and Sweden) had submitted a joint bid titled Nordic 2008. Eight venues selected for the bid included capitals of all four nations: The bid was announced in October 2001.

 Copenhagen – Parken Stadium (38,065)
 Copenhagen – Brøndby Stadium (29,000)
 Helsinki – Olympic Stadium (40,600)
 Tampere – Ratina Stadium (17,000)
 Oslo – Ullevaal Stadion (25,572)
 Trondheim – Lerkendal Stadion (21,116)
 Gothenburg – Ullevi Stadium (43,000)
 Stockholm – Råsunda Stadium (36,608)

Scotland–Republic of Ireland

In June 2000, the SFA refused to rule out a four way bid consisting Scotland–Northern Ireland–Wales–Republic of Ireland. In July 2000, David Taylor announced the bid would enhance if England failed to secure the 2006 FIFA World Cup. 

On 6 July 2000, England was eliminated from the second round of voting for the host of the 2006 FIFA World Cup. In February 2002, the Scottish Football Association (SFA), and the Football Association of Ireland (FAI), officially confirmed their joint bid to host the 2008 European Championship. 

The chief executive of the SFA, David Taylor, said that the bid envisioned Scotland hosting the opening match, three group stages, three quarter-finals, one semi-final and the final, with the Republic of Ireland hosting one group stage, one quarter-final, and one semi-final.

The final bid saw changes to the initial plan with stadia in Scotland hosting both semi-finals, as well as the final. Murrayfield would be the final venue, with Hampden and Celtic Park each hosting a semi-final match.

The eight venues would have been:
 Hampden Park, Glasgow (52,063)
 Ibrox Stadium, Glasgow (51,082)
 Celtic Park, Glasgow (60,832)
 Murrayfield Stadium, Edinburgh (67,200)
Two of the following three:
 Easter Road, Edinburgh (20,421, expanded to 34,880)
 New Aberdeen Stadium, Aberdeen (31,400)
 New Dundee Stadium, Dundee (31,400)
Two of the following three:
 Croke Park, Dublin (82,300)
 Lansdowne Road, Dublin (36,000, expanded to 51,700)
 New Dublin Stadium (Stadium Ireland), Abbotstown, Castleknock (80,000)

Had the bid been successful, the new stadium in Aberdeen would have been used by Aberdeen, replacing their current Pittodrie Stadium, while the new stadium in Dundee would have been shared by Dundee, Dundee United, and the Scottish Claymores American football team, replacing both Dens Park and Tannadice Park, following the competition. 

It was envisioned that Stadium Ireland would become the home of the Irish national football and rugby union teams, as well as a national stadium for Gaelic games within Ireland.

References

Bids
UEFA European Championship bids